Premieres of the Season is an international music festival founded by the Ministry of Culture of Ukraine and the Kyiv Organization of the National Union of Composers of Ukraine on December 1, 1988. The initiator and music director of the festival is Ukrainian composer Ihor Shcherbakov. Since 1989, it has been held annually in Kyiv, Ukraine, in the Spring, from late March to early April. In 2015, it was held from May 24 - June 1.

Concerts 
The festival traditionally presents symphonic, chamber, choral, and opera music performed by the best Ukrainian and foreign ensembles and soloists who are widely known in the world. The festival is a member of one of the world's most famous associations of music and theater festivals — the International Society for Performing Arts (ISPA). The festival program consists mainly of premieres of works by Ukrainian composers, but international composers have also premiered there.

Concerts of the festival are held in the Column Hall of the National Philharmonic of Ukraine, the Large and the Small Hall of the NMAU, the House of Organ Music, the House of Scientists, and other halls.

Concerts start at 12:00, 4:00 and 7:00.

Publications 
The festival also includes scientific conferences, master classes of composers and performers, presentations of new printed publications, CDs, video and audio recordings of new works, and creative meetings with outstanding artists.

20th anniversary 

On April 5 — 10, 2010, the 20th Anniversary International Festival of the Kyiv Organization of the National Union of Composers of Ukraine "Musical Premieres of the 2010 season" was held in Kyiv.

25th anniversary 

On May 24 — June 1, 2015, the 25th International Festival of the Kyiv Organization of the National Union of Composers of Ukraine "Musical Premieres of the 2015 season" was held in Kyiv.

The festival is dedicated to the holiday of the capital of Ukraine "Day of Kyiv."

See also 
 Chopin Music In The Open Air
 Kyiv Music Fest
 LvivMozArt
 Ihor Shcherbakov
 National Union of Composers of Ukraine
 Ministry of Culture (Ukraine)
 Ensemble Nostri Temporis
 Two Days and Two Nights of New Music

References

External links 
 на сайте Национального союза композиторов Украины
 Е.Дьячкова Между действием и медитацией
 О.Злотник Музика зблизька
 Програма фестивалю на 2006 рік
 Програма фестивалю на 2007 рік
 ПРОГРАМИ КОНЦЕРТІВ ХХ ФЕСТИВАЛЮ «МПС-2010» (2010 рік)

Music in Kyiv
Classical music festivals in Ukraine
Annual events in Ukraine
Culture in Kyiv
Music festivals in Ukraine
Music festivals established in 1990